John Erskine (1721–1803), the Scottish theologian, was born near Dunfermline at Carnock on 2 June 1721. His father was the great Scottish jurist John Erskine of Carnock and his grandfather was Colonel John Erskine of Cardross who had been in William of Orange's army when it invaded England in the Glorious Revolution of 1688.

Life
He was born on 2 June 1721 in Carnock in Fife (near Dunfermline).

He attended school in Cupar then the High School of Edinburgh followed by an M.A. at Edinburgh University. He then studied law for a time but quickly changed course for a religious career and was eventually licensed by the Presbytery of Dunblane 16 August 1743. He was ordained parish minister of Kirkintilloch, north of Glasgow, on 31 May 1744 and subsequently translated to Culross, in Fife on 21 February 1753.

On 15 June 1758 he took up position in New Greyfriars Church, Edinburgh. Then, on 9 July 1767 he was called to Old Greyfriars Church taking up position in 1768, where he became the colleague of Principal Robertson, the historian. Here he remained until his death, which took place on 19 January 1803. Erskine's writings consist chiefly of controversial pamphlets on theological subjects. His sermons were clear, vigorous expositions of a moderate Calvinism, in which metaphysical argument and practical morality are happily blended. He was very supportive of foreign missions, which he supported in the General Assembly - famously beginning a response to an opponent of such missions "Moderator, rax me (that is, hand me) that bible". His books, etc., show him to have been very prolific and to have been keenly interested in the politics of the day. He was against Roman Catholic Emancipation and on the side of the American Colonies in their dispute with King George III. (Scottish merchants had several days' advantage in crossing the Atlantic, and colonial harbours were often crowded with Glasgow ships). He received the honorary doctorate of Doctor of Divinity from Glasgow University in 1766.

He was well connected to the great religious events of the time - for example the religious revivals in Scotland, (see The 'Cambuslang Wark'), England (Methodism)and America (The Great Awakening). He obviously thought he was living in eventful times. In church politics he was the leader of the evangelical party, often seen as opponents of the Moderate Party, though his friendship with that Party's great leader, Principal Robertson belies this simple opposition.

He was well loved and respected and was asked to preach throughout the country. Sir Walter Scott praised Erskine in his novel Guy Mannering.

He died suddenly on 18 January 1803 and is buried in Greyfriars Kirkyard. The grave lies midway along the eastern side in front of the large Kerr memorial. A memorial window was also added in Greyfriars Kirk in his name.

Family

He married on 15 June 1746, the Hon. Christian Mackay (who died 20 May 1810), the fourth daughter of George Mackay, 3rd Lord Reay. They had a large family, eight sons and four daughters, many of whom died young - at least one in Bengal. His surviving heir was David Erskine of Carnock, born 18 April 1770, died 16 March 1838

His daughter, Mary Erskine, married Rev Charles Stuart of Dunearn.

Recognition

A memorial window to John Erskine was erected in Greyfriars Kirk in the late 19th century.

Bibliography

Works by John Erskine
 Erskine, John A fair and impartial account of the debate in the Synod of Glasgow and Air, Sixth October 1748, anent employing Mr. Whitefield. Edinburgh 1748
 Erskine, John An attempt to promote the frequent dispensing of the Lord's Supper Kilmarnock Printed and sold by J. Wilson ..., 1783
 Erskine, John Considerations on the spirit of popery, and the intended bill for the relief of papists in Scotland. 1778
 Erskine, John Discourses preached on several occasions 1801
 Erskine, John Discourses preached on several occasions. 1798
 Erskine, John Education of poor children recommended: : a sermon, preached in Lady Glenorchy's chapel, Edinburgh, 18 May 1774, before the managers of the Orphan-hospital, and published at their desire. / 1774
 Erskine, John Equity and wisdom of administration, in measures that have unhappily occasioned the American revolt, tried by the sacred oracles. 1776
 Erskine, John Fatal consequences and the general sources of anarchy. A discourse on Isaiah, xxiv. 1,-5. The substance of which was preached ... before the magistrates of Edinburgh, 2d September 1792. 1793
 Erskine, John History of the work of Redemption, containing the outlines of a body of divinity, in a method entirely new / by Jonathan Edwards; altered from the form of sermons, to that of a continued treatise by John Erskine. 1808
 Erskine, John Humble attempt to promote frequent communicating. 1749
 Erskine, John Influence of religion on national happiness. A sermon preached before the Society for propagating Christian Knowledge, ... on ... 5 January 1756. To which is annex'd, The present state of the said Society. 1756
 Erskine, John Letters chiefly written to comfort those bereaved of children or friends. Collected from books and mss. . 1803
 Erskine, John Meditations and letters of a pious youth (i.e. James Hall) lately deceas'd. : To which are prefix'd, reflections on his death and character, / by a friend in the country. 1746
 Erskine, John Ministers of the Gospel cautioned against giving offence. A sermon, 1764
 Erskine, John Mr Wesley's principles detected, or, A defence of the preface to the Edinburgh edition of Aspasio vindicated; in answer to Mr. Kershaw's Earnest appeal : to which is prefixed, the preface itself, for the use of those who have the English editions of Aspasio vindicated. Edinburgh : Printed for William Gray 1765.
 Erskine, John Narrative of the debate in the General Assembly of the Church of Scotland, 25 May 1779 : Occasioned by apprehensions of an intended repeal of the Penal Statutes against Papists.. 1780
 Erskine, John People of God consider'd as all righteous; in three sermons preach'd at Glasgow, April 1745. 1745
 Erskine, John Prayer for those in civil and military offices recommended, from a view of the influence of Providence ... a sermon. Preached before the election of the magistrates of Edinburgh, 5 October 1779 1779
 Erskine, John Qualifications necessary for teachers of Christianity. A sermon. 1750
 Erskine, John Reflections on the rise, progress, and probable consequences, of the present contentions with the colonies. By a freeholder. 1776
 Erskine, John Religious intelligence and seasonable advice from abroad from Connecticut Evangelical Magazine. Collection I-IV. 1801
 Erskine, John Reply to the religious scruples against inoculating the smallpox. : In a letter to a friend. 1791
 Erskine, John Shall I go to war with my American brethren? : a discourse addressed to all concerned in determining that important question : to which are now added a preface and appendix 1776
 Erskine, John Shall I go to war with my American brethren? : a discourse from Judges the XXth and 28th : addressed to all concerned in determining that important question 1769
 Erskine, John Sharp arrow shot against the enemies of the Reverend Mr. George Whitefield of pious remembrance; : in a letter to the author of the scurrilous Remarks lately publish'd against him. 1741
 Erskine, John Signs of the times consider'd, or, The high probability that the present appearances in New-England and the west of Scotland are a prelude to glorious things promised to the Church in the latter ages. 1742
 Erskine, John Sketches and hints of church history, and theological controversy. Chiefly translated or abridged from modern foreign writers. 1790
 Erskine, John Theological dissertations; containing, I. The nature of the Sinai Covenant. II. The character and privileges of the Apostolic Churches, with an examination of Dr. Taylor's key to the Epistles. III. The nature of saving faith. IV. The law of nature sufficiently promulgated to the heathens. V. An attempt to promote the frequent dispensing the Lord's Supper. 1765
 Erskine, John Vindication of the opposition to the late intended bill for the relief of Roman Catholics in Scotland; in which an address to the people on that subject, by the Reverend Dr. Campbell is particularly considered. 1780

Other
 Gillespie, Thomas (1708–1774) An essay on the continuance of immediate revelations of facts and future events in the Christian church / by the Reverend Mr Thomas Gillespie; with a letter on the danger of considering the influences of the Spirit as a rule of duty, by the late Reverend Mr James Cuthbert; and a preface, by John Erskine. Edinburgh 1771
 Extracts of letters (by E. Kent, Samuel Hopkins and Timothy Jones) from America, concerning the success of the gospel. Sent to a minister of the Church of Scotland [i.e. John Erskine], and published at his desire. Edinburgh 1766
 Select Discourses from the Fourth Volume of the American Preacher [compiled by David Austin] ... With a Supplement [compiled by John Erskine], containing a variety of interesting separate discourses, &c. published at different times and places in America Edinburgh 1801
 Religious intelligence and seasonable advice from abroad : concerning lay-preaching and exhortation ; collection I ; from the Connecticut evangelical magazine, no. 1st, 2d & 3d. ; and Mr. Edwards President of Princeton College, New Jersey, his thoughts on religion, &c. Collected by John Erskine Edinburgh J.Fairbairn and Ross & Blackwood, 1801.

References

Citations

Sources

 Jonathan M. Yeager, Enlightened Evangelicalism: The Life and Thought of John Erskine (Oxford University Press, 2011).

1721 births
People of the Scottish Enlightenment
18th-century Ministers of the Church of Scotland
Alumni of the University of Edinburgh
1803 deaths
John
People from Fife
Burials at Greyfriars Kirkyard
18th-century Scottish writers
Scottish evangelicals